The , or No Leprosy Patients in Our Prefecture Movement, was a government funded Japanese public health and social movement which began between 1929 and 1934. Its mission was to systematically eliminate leprosy, (Hansen's disease), a readily transmissible, previously incurable, chronic infectious disease caused by M. leprae, from each prefecture in Japan. This was to be achieved by caring for those affected by the disease in government funded sanatoriums.

Origin
In 1927, the Japanese government planned the dissolution of leprosy communities (leper colonies). The district welfare officers of Aichi Prefecture, Mamoru Uchida and Soichiro Shiotani, studied the conditions of the communities of the Honmyoji Temple in Kumamoto Prefecture. Six patients wished to enter the Kyushu Sanatorium, (later Kikuchi Keifuen Sanatorium). However, they were refused by Matsuki Miyazaki, the director of the sanatorium. Uchida and Shiotani brought the patients to Kensuke Mitsuda at the Nagashima Aiseien Sanatorium. Together, the welfare officers and Mitsuda initiated the movement. In 1931, the concept was made law. In the same year, the Empress Teimei founded the Leprosy Prevention Association. Eiichi Shibusawa was its president. The birthday of the empress, around 25 June, marked the beginning of an annual Leprosy Prevention Week. In 1952, at the time of the death of the empress, the name of the Leprosy Prevention Association was changed to Tofu Kyokai.

The movement
The governor of each prefecture raised funds for the building of leprosy sanatoriums. The movement and its slogans, for example, "donate 10-tsubo houses (33.058 square meters) to sanatoriums", were publicised in newspapers, radio, film advertisements, and through religious groups, schools and other organisations. For example, a Jodo Shinshu school founded an association called Otani Komyokai to popularise the movement.
 Patients were forcibly hospitalised.

Public response
Public interest in the movement varied between prefectures and over time. The people of  Tottori Prefecture were most supportive of the movement. Kiyotatsu Tatsuda, the governor of Tottori prefecture, raised funds for the movement, invited Mitsuda to give lectures about the movement and built six houses in the Airakuen sanatorium to accommodate leprosy patients from Tottori Prefecture. Fukuoka Prefecture, Yamaguchi Prefecture, Miyagi Prefecture, Toyama Prefecture, Okayama Prefecture, Saitama Prefecture, Aichi Prefecture and Mie Prefecture were also supportive.

Problems
The forced hospitalisation increased the leprosy stigma of the patients, their families and their neighbourhoods. Some patients were transferred beyond their own neighbourhoods, increasing their isolation. The conditions in sanatoriums suffered from overcrowding. Food ran short. In 1936, riots occurred and some patients escaped.

Masako Ogawa
Masako Ogawa was a Japanese physician who worked at the Nagashima Aiseien sanatorium. In 1938, she wrote the book, Spring in a Small Island which later became a film. She wrote of her experiences in persuading people with leprosy in remote areas to be hospitalised. Some criticised Ogawa for accelerating the "No leprosy patients in our prefecture" movement and giving an impression that leprosy was to be feared.

Second movement
On 31 December 1947, the Japanese government's Ministry of Interior Affairs, which had been responsible leprosy control, was abolished. After World War II, welfare officers were less involved because their role had induced stigma. Responsibility for control of leprosy was transferred to the prefectures. The names of patients previously reported to the head of police stations were reported to governors of prefectures. In November 1947, the  Ministry of Welfare commented on the "No leprosy patients in our prefecture" movement. It stated that the elimination of leprosy was important for the building of a cultural state, and therefore, should be accomplished. Hospitalization should be commenced with the most contagious patients. 
In 1949, the government advised that training courses for physicians and technicians should begin; physical examination of all citizens should occur and patients should be hospitalised, even on rumour. 
In 1952, Matsuo Fujimoto, an hospitalised leprosy patient from Kumamoto, was tried, found guilty and executed for murder. His execution was contentious because some people felt he was being unfairly treated because he was a leper. 
By 1955, the government bodies responsible for control of leprosy included the ministry of welfare; the prefectures; the departments of public health and medicine; the section of tuberculosis prevention and the national sanatoria. Working for the movement were medical schools and physicians, news media, women's groups, schools and religious groups. Physicians who lectured for the movement included Kensuke Mitsuda, Fumio Hayashi (doctor), Isamu Tajiri and Mamoru Uchida.

Statistics

Apologies
The following apology was issued by the Ohtani Sect of Jōdo Shinshu Buddhism:

In 2001, when the leprosy prevention law was ruled unconstitutional, the Prime Minister, the Minister of Welfare, and the National Diet published statements of apology to leprosy patients and their families. Several prefectural governors made apologies at public sanatoriums.

Compensation
In 2001, compensation to patients hospitalised between 1960 and 1998 was legislated. The compensation varied between 8,000,000 yen to 14,000,000 yen per person.

See also
 NIMBY, for "Not In My Back Yard", the general concept of rejecting projects that will change one's neighborhood.

Footnotes

References
 Tottori Prefecture, No leprosy movement in Tottori Prefecture 2008, Tottori Prefecture.
 Hiroaki Sugiyama, Leprosy in Yamaguchi Prefecture, especially no leprosy movement and its development Mar 2006, in the Journal of History of Yamaguchi Prefecture.
 Tofukyokai, Tofu Dayori, 2002, p. 14.
 Tsutomu Sato, 2007, On the beginning of no leprosy in our prefecture movement, Hansenbyo Shimingakkai Nenpo 2007(Hansen's disease citizen's association report) 2007,  p. 44.
 Kazushi Miyake, Sabetsusha no Bokuni Sasageru 1978, Banseisha.
 Masako Ogawa Spring in a small island 1938  Nagasaki Jirou Shoten.
 Eiko Arai, Hansen's disease and Christianity. 1996, Iwanami shoten.
 Tofu Kyokai, Leprosy in Japan 1955, Tofu Kyokai (Japanese Leprosy Foundation).
 Eishi Nomura, Hansen's disease and Shinshu 1996  p. 120 Shinshu Otaniha (a kind of Jodo Shinshu, True Pure Land School)

External links

 "No leprosy movement in Mie Prefecture". Retrieved on 20 October 2012.
 "No leprosy movement in Aichi Prefecture." Retrieved on 20 October 2012.
 "No leprosy movement." Retrieved on 20 October 2012.

Leprosy in Japan
Health campaigns